Francis Thomas Maloney (March 31, 1894January 16, 1945) was a U.S. Representative from Connecticut from 1933 to 1935 and a U.S. Senator from Connecticut from 1935 to 1945. He was a Democrat.

Early life
Maloney was born in Meriden, New Haven County, Connecticut, March 31, 1894. He was a Catholic and his father and maternal grandparents were from Ireland. He attended public and parochial schools of Meriden. From 1914 to 1921, he worked as a newspaper reporter, except for 1917–1918, when he served as a seaman first class in the US Navy during the First World War. He then engaged in real estate and insurance business.

Political career
Maloney served as mayor of Meriden from 1929 to 1933. He was elected as a Democrat to the U.S. House of Representatives of the seventy-third Congress and served from March 4, 1933, to January 3, 1935, in the session that was shorter than the usual two years because the time when the sessions would open was changed. He did not seek reelection, because he had been nominated for the Senate. He was elected to the Senate in 1934, re-elected in 1940 and served until his death in 1945. He was chairman of the Committee on Public Buildings and Grounds in the seventy-seventh through seventy-ninth Congresses.

Maloney was a delegate to the Democratic National Convention from Connecticut in 1936, 1940, and 1944.

He died in Meriden, Connecticut, on January 16, 1945, and was interred in Sacred Heart Cemetery.

Legacy
One of the two public high schools in Meriden, Connecticut, is named for Maloney.

See also
 List of United States Congress members who died in office (1900–49)

References

|-

|-

|-

|-

1894 births
1945 deaths
20th-century American politicians
United States Navy personnel of World War I
American people of Irish descent
Democratic Party members of the United States House of Representatives from Connecticut
Democratic Party United States senators from Connecticut
Mayors of places in Connecticut
Politicians from Meriden, Connecticut
Military personnel from Connecticut
United States Navy sailors